Tapestry Charter School is a charter school in Buffalo, New York. It houses two schools, an elementary/middle school and a high school. The current director is Eric Klapper.

Elementary 

The lower school for Tapestry School is located at 65 Great Arrow Avenue and serves Grades K through 8. The current principal is Jennifer Pangborn, and the current assistant principal is Anthony Riccio.

History 
Tapestry Charter School is an arts-integrated, K-12 Expeditionary Learning, tuition-free, public school located in the city of Buffalo, NY with 100 K-4 students, supporting administration, faculty and staff. Tapestry received approval from the State University of New York Board of Trustees to open in September 2001.  The school grew one grade per year, becoming a full K-12 school in the 2009-10 school year with 515 students. 98 percent of Tapestry’s first senior class graduated in June 2010. All seniors in all three of Tapestry's graduating classes have been accepted to college.

Former principals 
Previous assignment and reason for departure denoted in parentheses
Mrs. Joy Pepper–2001-2009
Ms. Christina Lesh–2009-2014 (Assistant Elementary Principal - Tapestry Charter School, resigned)

Former assistant principals 
Ms. Christina Lesh–2008-2009 (Director of Student Services - Stanley G. Falk School, named Elementary Principal of Tapestry Charter School)
Mr. Jack Turner–2012-2014 (Spanish teacher - Tapestry Charter High School, named Elementary Principal of Tapestry Charter School; later K-8 Principal at Global Concepts Charter School from 2017-2022 and current Global Concepts Curriculum Coordinator.)

High school

Tapestry Charter High School is located at 65 Great Arrow Avenue and serves Grades 9-12.

History 
Tapestry Charter High School opened in 2009.

Academics

External links 
Tapestry Charter High School

Charter schools in New York (state)
Education in Erie County, New York
Public elementary schools in New York (state)
Public middle schools in New York (state)
Public high schools in New York (state)
Schools in Buffalo, New York